Jiri Lev (born 1979) is a Czech-Australian architect and urbanist, active in the field of sustainable residential, sacred and public architecture, disaster recovery and humanitarian development.

Lev's works are known for their highly varied, regionally specific and contextual architectural style, and frequent use of natural, raw and locally sourced construction materials, such as timber, stone, hempcrete, canite or clay and lime products (Gulgong Holtermann Museum, Courtyard House, Tasmanian House). He teaches on sustainable and resilient architecture in lectures, workshops and writing.

Early life 
Lev was born in the Czech Republic, then part of Czechoslovakia, to architect, academic and politician Jiri Loew, and Lydie Loewova, an architect. He was educated at a grammar school in Brno, Moravia. As a child he was inspired by growing up in an environment filled with his parents' architectural drawings, models, natural science collections, books and plants, just before the proliferation of internet and social media.

He first established his multidisciplinary design practice in Prague in 1998. In 2005 he moved to Sydney, Australia.

Lev studied architecture at the University of Newcastle under Richard Leplastrier and Kerry and Lindsay Clare. During studies he founded ArchiCamp, a grassroots architecture festival focused on invited architectural intervention in disadvantaged or disaster stricken rural communities.

Career 
Lev first opened his practice Atelier Jiri Lev in 2014. His first commission was Gulgong Holtermann Museum, a volunteer-driven community project involving adaptive reuse of two historic buildings featured on Australian banknotes, as well as several new multi-purpose pavilions.

In response to the 2019-20 Australian bushfires Lev established Architects Assist, an initiative of Australian architecture firms providing pro bono assistance to the victims, as "a platform for equitable access to sustainable and resilient architecture." In 2020 the initiative had 600 participating architecture firms.

In 2020 Lev's practice revealed plans for two model ecovillage developments in Tasmania, addressing the concurrent housing and environmental crises, inspired by the cohousing and ecovillage movements and traditional European settlements. A network of small, compact urban forms was proposed, surrounded by shared agricultural land and managed wilderness. A prototype residence was completed in 2021.

After the 2021 South Moravia tornado in Czechia, Lev founded Architekti Pro Bono, an initiative of Czech architects assisting the victims.

Practice 
Lev advocates for localised, regionally specific architectural style. In his work he references and interprets vernacular architecture. He claims that globalised design trends are highly destructive to the identity and spirit of places where they are introduced. He often refers to the principles of new urbanism.

Lev's works often utilise natural, raw and locally sourced construction materials and avoid or minimise the use of chemical treatments, plastics and synthetic paints. His buildings have been called "almost edible" and his approach described as "design for an economy of means, a generosity of ends."

Lev's practice has delivered a large number of pro bono and community projects, often as part of organised workshops and student engagement. Occasionally the firm releases plans for sustainable dwellings as open source into the public domain.

The firm is known not to publicise their own work or enter awards.

See also 
 Sustainable architecture
 Vernacular architecture
 Contextual architecture
 New urbanism
 Australian architects

References

External links 
 ArchDaily
 Divisare

Living people
1979 births
Architects from Sydney
Czech emigrants to Australia
Brno University of Technology alumni
Czech architects
Australian ecclesiastical architects